The Ballad of Songbirds and Snakes is a dystopian action-adventure novel by American author Suzanne Collins. It is a spin-off and a prequel to The Hunger Games trilogy. It was released on May 19, 2020, by Scholastic. An audiobook of the novel read by American actor Santino Fontana was released simultaneously with the printed edition. The book received a virtual launch due to the COVID-19 pandemic. A film adaptation from Lionsgate is set to be released on November 17, 2023.

Plot

Set in the universe of The Hunger Games, 64 years before the first installment, the book follows young Coriolanus Snow, who is far from the callous president seen in the original trilogy. The Snow family was once one of the richest in the Capitol prior to the war that resulted in the creation of the Hunger Games ten years earlier. Coriolanus "Coryo" is now an orphan living with his grandmother and cousin, Tigris, in an apartment they cannot afford, without the money to purchase food or clothes.

Based on his academic excellence at the Academy, the Capitol's most prestigious high school, Coriolanus is chosen to mentor a tribute in the upcoming tenth Hunger Games. He is assigned the District 12 female tribute, Lucy Gray Baird, member of a traveling musician group known as the Covey, who were forced into District 12 after the war began. Lucy Gray sparks the Capitol's attention after slipping a hidden snake into the clothing of Mayfair, the mayor's cruel daughter, who had arranged for her to be chosen as tribute because of jealousy about a boy named Billy Taupe, as well as singing during the reaping. Coriolanus is determined to make a good impression, since his success in the games will most likely guarantee the monetary prize he needs in order to attend the University.

Coriolanus decides to meet Lucy Gray at the train station where the tributes are set to arrive, and accidentally ends up with them in their transport vehicle. Some of the tributes consider killing him, but are dissuaded by Lucy Gray when she warns them that their families would likely be punished. The transport vehicle drops the stunned Coriolanus and the tributes in the Capitol Zoo. He and Lucy Gray seize the opportunity to put on a show and begin earning the sympathy of the Capitol's citizens. 

Coriolanus starts sneaking Lucy Gray food from the Academy, as the Capitol isn't feeding the tributes. The other mentors follow suit, including Sejanus Plinth, a boy disgusted by the Games. Sejanus was originally from District 2, until his father bought the family's way into the Capitol after siding with them and building a munitions empire during the war. The arrangement ends when one mentor, Arachne Crane, is murdered by her tribute after taunting her with food. Clemensia, Coriolanus‘s classmate, is distraught by the murder, leaving him to complete an essay on ways to increase viewership for the games - which they were supposed to do together - by himself. He presents the essay to Head Gamemaker Volumnia Gaul, proposing a betting scheme and sponsorship of the tributes to engage the people of the Capitol in the outcome of the Games. Dr. Gaul drops the essay into a tank of genetically modified snakes. Coriolanus is forced to retrieve a few pages of the essay from the enclosure but is ignored by the snakes. However, they attack Clemensia when she reaches in, proving that Coriolanus was the sole author of the project since the snakes did not recognize her scent in the paper. Clemensia is severely poisoned and hospitalized.

During a tour of the arena, undetected bombs explode, killing several tributes and mentors. Lucy Gray considers escaping in the chaos, but decides to help an injured Snow, saving his life. Despite the bad publicity this generates, the Games begin, with many tributes quickly dying from starvation, disease, or injuries, while Dr. Gaul enacts Coriolanus‘s proposals within the Games. Sejanus, resentful of both the Capitol and the Games, enters the Arena at night intending to die as a martyr; Dr. Gaul orders Coriolanus to extract him. He convinces Sejanus to leave, explaining that his suicide would not be seen by anyone due to the footage being altered and that he could make more of a change if he decided to live. As they leave, they are attacked by a group of tributes who had noticed them. In the ensuing chase, Coriolanus is forced to bludgeon one of the tributes to death in self-defense, marking his first ever killing of another human.

While in the lab, Coriolanus notices a tank of the same genetically modified snakes he and Clemensia encountered being transported. Suspecting that they are going to be dropped in the arena , he drops a handkerchief with Lucy Gray's scent inside the tank to accustom the snakes to her. As Coriolanus expects, the genetically modified snakes are dropped into the arena. They attack several tributes except Lucy Gray, surrounding and climbing on her but not biting. After several days, Lucy Gray wins the Games thanks to the handkerchief and a compact full of rat poison Coriolanus had given her earlier. At a celebration party at the Academy, Coriolanus is confronted with evidence implicating him in cheating in the Games and stealing food from the Academy. Facing punishment and public humiliation, he is forced to become a Peacekeeper in District 12.

Coriolanus reunites with Lucy Gray in District 12, and begins to develop romantic feelings for her. He discovers that Sejanus, now a fellow Peacekeeper, plans to help District 12 residents escape to a place north of the district which is rumored to be beyond the Capitol's control. Coriolanus surreptitiously sends word to Dr. Gaul in the Capitol using a jabberjay that recorded the evidence. Lucy Gray's former lover Billy Taupe and Mayfair overhear a conversation between Sejanus and a rebel named Spruce, and are subsequently shot dead by Spruce and Coriolanus (who stumbled upon the meeting with Lucy Gray) to prevent them from blowing their cover. A few days later, Spruce is found severely injured and eventually dies, while Sejanus is arrested by the Peacekeepers and hanged for treason, leaving Lucy Gray and Coriolanus as the only remaining witnesses of the murders. Lucy Gray tells Coriolanus that she is going to escape to the North and he decides to leave with her, despite being offered a spot in officer training school in District 2.

On their way to the North, Coriolanus accidentally finds the hidden guns used to shoot Billy Taupe and Mayfair. Coriolanus realizes that with the evidence in hand, he could bury what had happened and make a new life for himself. Worried that Lucy Gray had discerned that he was responsible for Sejanus's death, since he sent incriminating evidence against him to Dr. Gaul, he tries to kill her but she disappears. Coriolanus shoots in all directions, but it is left uncertain whether she managed to escape. After dumping the incriminating weapons into a lake, Coriolanus returns to District 12 and is sent back to the Capitol, where Dr. Gaul explains that she had arranged for him to be sent to District 12 so he could obtain more experience and ultimately come to terms with her view of human nature as inherently violent. Coriolanus is given a spot at the university under her tutelage. He is effectively adopted by Sejanus's father Strabo, who is unaware of the role he played in Sejanus's death.

In the epilogue, Dean Highbottom, the dean of the Academy, reveals he had developed the idea of the Hunger Games simply as a cruel, but theoretical, idea for a school project with Coryo's father, Crassus. Crassus would later present the idea to Dr. Gaul, making the Games a reality and causing animosity between Highbottom and Crassus. Thoroughly tired of Highbottom's obstructive actions, as well as the Dean's opposition and hatred of him, Coriolanus slips some poison into Highbottom's drugs, starting the trademark killings that would fuel his rise to power. In the meantime, Coriolanus implements many of his ideas into future Hunger Games as a Gamemaker. Having either died or possibly escaped the country of Panem, Lucy Gray is never seen or heard from again.

Reception 
The Ballad of Songbirds and Snakes has received generally positive reviews from critics. Upon release day, critics had an overall mixed reception to the novel, but it has undergone a positive reappraisal in the years since. The review aggregator website Book Marks, which assigns individual ratings to book reviews from mainstream literary critics, indicated that the novel received a cumulative "Positive" rating based on 19 reviews.

The Guardian praised the book: "Collins's themes of friendship, betrayal, authority and oppression, as well as the extra layers of lore about mockingjays and Capitol's history, will please and thrill." Similarly, Time stated that Collins shines most "as she weaves in tantalising details that lend depth to the gruesome world she created in the original series." Kirkus Reviews gave it a starred review, saying the book is "both a tense, character-driven piece and a cautionary tale."

Meanwhile, The Telegraph criticized it as "not the most promising opening [fans expected]" and that Collins should "stick to plucky heroes and dazzling plot-twists. When it comes to writing the murkiest backwaters of the human psyche, Collins is fathoms out of her depth." Entertainment Weekly said of the storytelling: "The storytelling itself trends desperate at times. Chapters close on violent cliffhangers that edge into parody" and that "there are too many folk music interludes [and] some ludicrous franchise callbacks" but overall it "is a major work with major flaws, but it sure gives you a lot to chew on," ultimately giving it a grade of B−.

The songs from the novel spurred several original covers on YouTube.

Film adaptation

In August 2017, Lionsgate CEO Jon Feltheimer expressed interest in spin-offs of The Hunger Games, with intentions to create a writers' room to explore the concept.

In June 2019, Joe Drake, Chairman of the Lionsgate Motion Picture Group, announced that the company is working with Collins with regards to an adaptation of The Ballad of Songbirds and Snakes. By April 2020, Collins and Lionsgate confirmed that plans were underway for the film's development. Casting had not yet begun, but director Francis Lawrence has been confirmed to return after his success with The Hunger Games trilogy. The film’s writer will be Michael Arndt, with Nina Jacobson and author Suzanne Collins as producers.

In August 2021, Lionsgate chairman Joe Drake revealed that the film was in pre-production with filming expected to begin in early 2022 for a targeted release of "either late fiscal 2023 or early 2024." On April 28, 2022, it was announced that the film will release on November 17, 2023.

On May 16, 2022, it was announced that  Tom Blyth had been cast as the young President Snow. On May 31, Rachel Zegler was cast as Lucy Gray Baird. On June 15, Josh Andrés Rivera was cast as Sejanus Plinth. On June 22, Hunter Schafer was cast as Tigris. On June 27, Jason Schwartzman was cast as Lucretius "Lucky" Flickerman. In July, Peter Dinklage was reported to have been cast as Dean Highbottom.

On June 6, 2022, Lionsgate Motion Picture Group released a teaser trailer for the film.

References

2020 American novels
Action novels
American adventure novels
American post-apocalyptic novels
American science fiction novels
Books by Suzanne Collins
Novels about politicians
Prequel novels
4
Scholastic Corporation books